Darrington Municipal Airport  is a public airport located in Darrington, a rural town in Snohomish County, Washington, United States. It is owned and operated by the town government and is situated west–east along the north side of State Route 530.

The airport has a single, paved runway that measures  in length. It is primarily used for general aviation purposes. Darrington constructed the airport in 1958 and added several hangars in the 1980s. The airport has also hosted various events, including the first editions of the local rodeo in the 1960s. The west end of the airport grounds is used as a local cemetery.

References

Transportation in Snohomish County, Washington
Airports in Snohomish County, Washington